Domingo Martínez de Irala (c. 1509 Bergara, Gipuzkoa – c. 1556 Asunción, Paraguay) was a Spanish Basque conquistador.

He headed for America in 1535 enrolled in the expedition of Pedro de Mendoza and participated in the founding of Buenos Aires. He explored the Paraná and Paraguay Rivers along with Juan de Ayolas and was commanding the rear-guard when Ayolas' advance party was wiped out by the Payagua Indians.

Unique in Spanish America, the colony had been granted by Charles V the right to elect its own commander under such circumstances; and in August 1538, de Irala was elected by the conquistadors as Captain General of the Río de la Plata.

In 1539, he began to move the inhabitants of Buenos Aires to Asunción, and the city was abandoned by 1541.

He outlasted Charles V's appointee, Álvar Núñez Cabeza de Vaca, whom he had recalled to Spain for trial as a traitor. Although Juan de Sanabria and his son Diego were appointed governor in 1547 and 1549, they never fulfilled their commissions, and de Irala was confirmed by the king as governor in 1552.

He ruled forcefully until his death around 1556. During his rule, he had churches and public buildings erected, towns established, and the native population subjugated and distributed among the colonists in encomiendas. He was succeeded by Gonzalo de Mendoza.

Irala had 70 Guaraní concubines, and his surname fills several pages in the Asunción telephone directory.

See also
 History of Paraguay
 India Juliana

Notes

Sources 
 Maura, Juan Francisco (2008) Alvar Núñez Cabeza de Vaca: El gran burlador de América Publicaciones de Parnaseo, Universidad de Valencia, Valencia, Spain, in Spanish
 Infoplease

Spanish conquistadors
Explorers of Argentina
1500s births
1550s deaths
Basque conquistadors
People from Bergara
16th century in the Viceroyalty of Peru
16th-century Spanish people
16th-century explorers
Governors of the Río de la Plata